St. James is a census-designated place (CDP) in Washington County, Maryland, United States. The population was 1,657 at the 2000 census. It is also the home of St. James School, Hagerstown, a small, Episcopalian, boarding school. St. James was formerly named "Lydia."

Geography
St. James is located at  (39.575484, −77.739274).

Demographics

As of the census of 2000, there were 1,657 people, 631 households, and 499 families residing in the CDP. The racial makeup of the CDP was 95.65% White, 2.29% African American, 1.21% Asian, 0.42% from other races, and 0.42% from two or more races. Hispanic or Latino of any race were 0.78% of the population.

There were 631 households, out of which 36.3% had children under the age of 18 living with them, 70.8% were married couples living together, 6.3% had a female householder with no husband present, and 20.9% were non-families. 16.8% of all households were made up of individuals, and 9.0% had someone living alone who was 65 years of age or older. The average household size was 2.62 and the average family size was 2.94.

In the CDP, the population was spread out, with 24.9% under the age of 18, 5.6% from 18 to 24, 29.1% from 25 to 44, 26.3% from 45 to 64, and 14.2% who were 65 years of age or older. The median age was 39 years. For every 100 females, there were 96.3 males. For every 100 females age 18 and over, there were 94.2 males.

The median income for a household in the CDP was $53,750, and the median income for a family was $65,924. Males had a median income of $39,464 versus $28,594 for females. The per capita income for the CDP was $20,193. About 2.3% of families and 5.1% of the population were below the poverty line, including 9.7% of those under age 18 and 3.3% of those age 65 or over.

References

Census-designated places in Washington County, Maryland
Census-designated places in Maryland